The Kuha-class minesweepers was a series of eighteen small minesweepers of the Finnish Navy. The ships were constructed in three batches between 1941 and 1946. Some of the vessels participated in World War II, but their main mission were to be the demining of the Gulf of Finland after the war.

The vessels were built by August Eklöf Ab in Porvoo, starting in 1941.

Vessels of the class

Kuha 1-6
Kuha 1, Kuha lost 3 November 1941
Kuha 2, Salakka: Scrapped in 1959.
Kuha 3, Siika Sunk off Suusaari by mines 30 Sept., 1944
Kuha 4, Harjus: Scrapped in 1959, or sunk by mine off Hanko 28 July 1940, or lost 23 July 1942
Kuha 5, Säynäs
Kuha 6, Karppi  Sunk off Kotka by mines 15 Sept., 1944

Kuha 7-14
Delivered in 1945
Kuha 7
Kuha 8
Kuha 9: Scrapped in 1960.
Kuha 10
Kuha 11
Kuha 12
Kuha 13
Kuha 14

Kuha 15-18
Delivered in 1946
Kuha 15
Kuha 16
Kuha 17
Kuha 18

References

Ships of the Finnish Navy
Minesweepers of the Finnish Navy
Mine warfare vessel classes
Ships built in Finland